Brown Brothers may refer to:

Brown Bros. & Co. a bank, later merging to become Brown Brothers Harriman & Co.
Brown Brothers Harriman & Co., the oldest and largest private bank in the United States
Brown Brothers (engineering) a Scottish engineering company incorporated into Vickers plc
Brown Brothers Milawa Vineyard, an Australian wine company
Brown Brothers Tobacco Company, a 19th-century Detroit cigar manufacturing business
Brown Brothers of Great Eastern Street, London, UK, manufacturer of the Brown quadricycle first sold in 1899
Six Brown Brothers, a jazz sextet